Krefftichthys anderssoni is a species of lanternfish found circumglobally in the southern oceans.  This species grows to a length of  SL.

References
 

Myctophidae
Monotypic fish genera
Taxa named by Einar Lönnberg
Fish described in 1905